Ninkasi Brewing Company is a microbrewery based in Eugene, Oregon.

History 
Named after the Sumerian goddess of beer, Ninkasi was founded in 2006 by Jamie Floyd and Nikos Ridge. The first beer they produced was Total Domination IPA. Production reached 56,000 barrels in 2011 and by 2013 production had increased to 86,000.

The company's headquarters are in Eugene's Whiteaker neighborhood, which is also home to several other local breweries.

Products 
Beer varieties include Tricerahops Double IPA, Dawn of the Red IRA, Believer Double Red, and Oatis Oatmeal Stout. Their beers are available in Alaska, Alberta, British Columbia, Arizona, California, Colorado, Idaho, Nevada, Oregon, Utah, Washington, and Virginia. In 2010, Ninkasi produced over 32,000 barrels of beer.

 Dawn of the Red: Red IPA
 Far North x Northwest: Wheat Beer Made in Collaboration with 49th State Brewing Co
 Hazy Domination: Hazy IPA
 Oatis: Oatmeal Stout
 Prismatic: Juicy IPA
 Total Domination IPA: Northwest IPA
 Tricerahops Double IPA: Double IPA

See also
 Brewing in Oregon
 List of microbreweries

References

Further reading
 
 Foyston, John (October 13, 2012). "Ninkasi expansion fourth since 2006, will triple capacity". The Oregonian.
 New beers from Alaskan, Widmer & Ninkasi on shelves now... |. The Oregonian.
 Ninkasi moves up to No. 3 in Oregon beer sales - Portland Business Journal
 Beer and Community: Ninkasi Isn't Just a Brewery - Eugene Daily News | Eugene Daily News

External links
 
Ninkasi Brewing Company Collection, 2012-2014
 Ninkasi Brewing of Eugene, Oregon. Photos from The Oregonian.

Companies based in Eugene, Oregon
Beer brewing companies based in Oregon
2006 establishments in Oregon
American companies established in 2006